5th New York Film Critics Online Awards
December 11, 2005

The 5th New York Film Critics Online Awards, honoring the best in filmmaking in 2005, were given on 11 December 2005.

Top 9 Films
(in alphabetical order)
Brokeback Mountain
Capote
The Constant Gardener
Crash
Good Night, and Good Luck
La meglio gioventù (The Best of Youth)
Munich
The Squid and the Whale
Syriana

Winners
 Best Actor: Philip Seymour Hoffman – Capote
 Best Actress: Keira Knightley – Pride & Prejudice
 Best Animated Film: Wallace & Gromit: The Curse of the Were-Rabbit
 Best Cinematography: March of the Penguins – Laurent Chalet and Jérôme Maison
 Best Debut Director: Paul Haggis – Crash
 Best Director: Fernando Meirelles – The Constant Gardener
 Best Documentary: Grizzly Man
 Best Film: The Squid and the Whale
 Best Foreign Language Film: Der Untergang (Downfall) • Austria/Germany/Italy
 Best Screenplay: Crash – Paul Haggis
 Best Supporting Actor: Oliver Platt – Casanova
 Best Supporting Actress: Amy Adams – Junebug
 Breakthrough Performer: Terrence Howard – Crash, Four Brothers, Get Rich or Die Tryin', and Hustle & Flow

References

New York Film Critics Online Awards
2005 film awards
2005 in American cinema